Heliopsis is a genus of herbaceous flowering plants in the family Asteraceae, native to dry prairies in North and South America. Species are commonly called ox-eye or oxeye.

The name Heliopsis (pronounced , from Greek helios for "sun" and opsis for "appearance") refers to the bright yellow color of the flowers.

Species are found widely in cultivation in temperate climates, notably varieties of H. helianthoides.

Species
There are about 18 species, including:
 Heliopsis annua – Zacatecas, Oaxaca, Coahuila, Michoacán, Querétaro, Guanajuato, Nuevo León, Puebla, México State, Hidalgo, San Luis Potosí
 Heliopsis anomala – Baja California Sur
 Heliopsis buphthalmoides (synonym Heliopsis canescens) – Chiapas, Oaxaca, Panama, Honduras, Costa Rica, Guatemala, Colombia, Ecuador, Venezuela, Peru, Bolivia
 Heliopsis decumbens – Peru
 Heliopsis filifolia – Coahuila
 Heliopsis gracilis – smooth oxeye, pinewoods oxeye – southeastern and south-central United States
 Heliopsis helianthoides – smooth oxeye, false sunflower, oxeye, rough oxeye – most of eastern and central USA and Canada
 Heliopsis lanceolata –  Colombia 
 Heliopsis longipes – gold root – San Luis Potosí
 Heliopsis novogaliciana – Jalisco, Durango, Sinaloa
 Heliopsis parviceps – Guerrero
 Heliopsis parvifolia – mountain oxeye – northern Mexico, southwestern United States
 Heliopsis procumbens – Durango, Jalisco, Mexico State, Distrito Federal, Sinaloa
 Heliopsis sinaloensis – Sinaloa
 Heliopsis suffruticosa –  Zacatecas

References

 
Asteraceae genera
Flora of North America
Flora of South America